John Huddleston (1608-1698) was an English Benedictine monk and priest.

John Huddleston is the name of:

John Huddleston (MP for Cumberland) (died 1493)
John Huddleston (MP for Cambridgeshire) (1517-57)
John Huddleston (cricketer) (1837-1904), Australian cricketer
John Huddleston (American football) (born 1954), American football player
John Dormer (Jesuit) (real name John Huddleston), (1636-1700), English Jesuit cleric
John Walter Huddleston (1815–1890), English lawyer and judge